Acangassu is a beetle genus in the Cerambycinae subfamily and the tribe Ibidionini. It was previously placed in the obsolete monotypic tribe Acangassuini Galileo & Martins, 2001. It contains a single species, Acangassu diminuta. It is widespread in southern Brazil (Rio de Janeiro).

References

Cerambycinae
Monotypic Cerambycidae genera